Stochastic dominance is a partial order between random variables. It is a form of stochastic ordering. The concept arises in decision theory and decision analysis in situations where one gamble (a probability distribution over possible outcomes, also known as prospects) can be ranked as superior to another gamble for a broad class of decision-makers. It is based on shared preferences regarding sets of possible outcomes and their associated probabilities. Only limited knowledge of preferences is required for determining dominance.  Risk aversion is a factor only in second order stochastic dominance.

Stochastic dominance does not give a total order, but rather only a partial order: for some pairs of gambles, neither one stochastically dominates the other, since different members of the broad class of decision-makers will differ regarding which gamble is preferable without them generally being considered to be equally attractive.

The notation  means that  has distribution .

There are a sequence of stochastic dominance orderings, from first , to second , to higher orders . The sequence is increasingly more inclusive. That is, if , then  for all . Further, there exists  such that  but not .

Stochastic dominance could trace back to (Blackwell, 1953), but it was not developed until 1969–1970.

Statewise dominance

The simplest case of stochastic dominance is statewise dominance (also known as state-by-state dominance), defined as follows:

 Random variable A is statewise dominant over random variable B if A gives at least as good a result in every state (every possible set of outcomes), and a strictly better result in at least one state.

For example, if a dollar is added to one or more prizes in a lottery, the new lottery statewise dominates the old one because it yields a better payout regardless of the specific numbers realized by the lottery. Similarly, if a risk insurance policy has a lower premium and a better coverage than another policy, then with or without damage, the outcome is better. Anyone who prefers more to less (in the standard terminology, anyone who has monotonically increasing preferences) will always prefer a statewise dominant gamble.

First-order

Statewise dominance is implied by first-order stochastic dominance (FSD), which is defined as:

 Random variable A has first-order stochastic dominance over random variable B if for any outcome x, A gives at least as high a probability of receiving at least x as does B, and for some x, A gives a higher probability of receiving at least x. In notation form,  for all x, and for some x, .

In terms of the cumulative distribution functions of the two random variables, A dominating B means that  for all x, with strict inequality at some x.

Equivalent definitions 
 For any  that is non-decreasing, 

 
 There exists two random variables , such that , where .
The first definition states that a gamble  first-order stochastically dominates gamble  if and only if every expected utility maximizer with an increasing utility function prefers gamble  over gamble .

The third definition states that we can construct a pair of gambles  with distributions , such that gamble  always pays at least as much as gamble . More concretely, construct first a uniformly distributed , then use the inverse transform sampling to get , then  for any .

Pictorially, the second and third definition are equivalent, because we can go from the graphed density function of A to that of B both by pushing it upwards and pushing it leftwards.

Extended example 
Consider three gambles over a single toss of a fair six-sided die:

 

Gamble A statewise dominates gamble B because A gives at least as good a yield in all possible states (outcomes of the die roll) and gives a strictly better yield in one of them (state 3). Since A statewise dominates B, it also first-order dominates B.

Gamble C does not statewise dominate B because B gives a better yield in states 4 through 6, but C first-order stochastically dominates B because Pr(B ≥ 1) = Pr(C ≥ 1) = 1, Pr(B ≥ 2) = Pr(C ≥ 2) = 3/6, and Pr(B ≥ 3) = 0 while Pr(C ≥ 3) = 3/6 > Pr(B ≥ 3).

Gambles A and C cannot be ordered relative to each other on the basis of first-order stochastic dominance because Pr(A ≥ 2) = 4/6 > Pr(C ≥ 2) = 3/6 while on the other hand Pr(C ≥ 3) = 3/6 > Pr(A ≥ 3) = 0.

In general, although when one gamble first-order stochastically dominates a second gamble, the expected value of the payoff under the first will be greater than the expected value of the payoff under the second, the converse is not true: one cannot order lotteries with regard to stochastic dominance simply by comparing the means of their probability distributions. For instance, in the above example C has a higher mean (2) than does A (5/3), yet C does not first-order dominate A.

Second-order

The other commonly used type of stochastic dominance is second-order stochastic dominance. All risk-averse expected-utility maximizers (that is, those with increasing and concave utility functions) prefer a second-order stochastically dominant gamble to a dominated one. Second-order dominance describes the shared preferences of a smaller class of decision-makers (those for whom more is better and who are averse to risk, rather than all those for whom more is better) than does first-order dominance.

Equivalently,  dominates  in the second order if and only if  for all nondecreasing and concave utility functions .

Equivalent definitions 

 For any  that is non-decreasing, and (not necessarily strictly) concave,

 
These are analogous with the equivalent definitions of first-order stochastic dominance, given above.

Sufficient conditions

 First-order stochastic dominance of A over B is a sufficient condition for second-order dominance of A over B.
 If B is a mean-preserving spread of A, then A second-order stochastically dominates B.

Necessary conditions

  is a necessary condition for A to second-order stochastically dominate B.

Third-order

 
 .

Equivalently,  dominates  in the third order if and only if  for all . 

The set  has two equivalent definitions:

 the set of nondecreasing, concave utility functions that are positively skewed (that is, have a nonnegative third derivative throughout).

Here,  is defined as the solution to the problemSee more details at risk premium page.

Sufficient condition

 Second-order dominance is a sufficient condition.

Necessary conditions

  is a necessary condition.
  is a necessary condition.

Higher-order

Higher orders of stochastic dominance have also been analyzed, as have generalizations of the dual relationship between stochastic dominance orderings and classes of preference functions.
Arguably the most powerful dominance criterion relies on the accepted economic assumption of decreasing absolute risk aversion.
This involves several analytical challenges and a research effort is on its way to address those.

Formally, the n-th-order stochastic dominance is defined as 

These relations are transitive and increasingly more inclusive. That is, if , then  for all . Further, there exists  such that  but not .

Constraints

Stochastic dominance relations may be used as constraints in problems of mathematical optimization, in particular stochastic programming. In a problem of maximizing a real functional  over random variables  in a set  we may additionally require that  stochastically dominates a fixed random benchmark . In these problems, utility functions play the role of Lagrange multipliers associated with 
stochastic dominance constraints. Under appropriate conditions, the solution of the problem is also a (possibly local) solution of the problem to maximize
If the
first order stochastic dominance constraint is employed, the utility function  is nondecreasing; 
if the second order stochastic dominance constraint is used,  is nondecreasing and concave. A system of linear equations can test whether a given solution if efficient for any such utility function.
Third-order stochastic dominance constraints can be dealt with using convex quadratically constrained programming (QCP).

See also

Modern portfolio theory
Marginal conditional stochastic dominance
Responsive set extension - equivalent to stochastic dominance in the context of preference relations.
Quantum catalyst
Ordinal Pareto efficiency
Lexicographic dominance

References

Random variable ordering